Nalkutan F.C. is a Vanuatuan football team based in Tanna. They are known to be the second non-Port Vila based club that has qualified for the OFC Champions League.

History
Nalkutan was founded in 1963. However there is not much known about the first 50 years. However, in 2011 Nalkutan won the VFF TVL cup after beating Sia-Raga 1-0. This was the first time since 1980 that a non-Port Vila club has won the cup.
In 2016 they made headlights through all of the Oceania Region when they won the VFF National Super League which meant that they had qualified for the 2018 OFC Champions League for the first time in the history of the club

Achievements
VFF National Super League:1
Winners: 2016

Current squad
Squad for the 2018 OFC Champions League

References

Football clubs in Vanuatu